Theory is a type of abstract or generalizing thinking, or its result.

Theory may also refer to:

 Scientific theory, a well-substantiated explanation of some aspect of the natural world
 Social theory, an analytical framework or paradigm that is used to study and interpret social phenomena
 Philosophical theory, a position that explains or accounts for a general philosophy or specific branch of philosophy
 Literary theory, the systematic study of the nature of literature, or any of a variety of scholarly approaches to reading texts
Mathematical theory, an area of mathematical research that is relatively self-contained
 Theory (mathematical logic), a set of sentences (theorems) in a formal language
 Theory, a type of argument in policy debate and Lincoln–Douglas debate
 Theory (chess), consensus and literature on how the game should be played
 Theory (clothing retailer), a New York-based fashion label
 Theory Eatery, an American cuisine restaurant in Portland, Oregon
 Theory (poem), a poem from Wallace Stevens's first book of poetry, Harmonium, published in 1917
 Ki:Theory, the American recording artist and producer Joel Burleson
 Theory of a Deadman, also known as Theory, a rock band
The former stage name of hip hop and smooth jazz artist Dax Reynosa
A computer algebra system software, predecessor to LiveMath.
Austin Theory, American professional wrestler

See also

 Theorem
 List of notable theories
 Theoria, theological contemplation
Mathematical theory (disambiguation)
 Thiery (surname)
 Thierry, given name and surname
 Theorema (disambiguation)
 Teorema (disambiguation)